Serena and Venus Williams defeated Tímea Babos and Yaroslava Shvedova in the final, 6–3, 6–4 to win the ladies' doubles tennis title at the 2016 Wimbledon Championships. It was the Williams sisters' sixth Wimbledon doubles title, and their 14th and last major doubles title overall.

Martina Hingis and Sania Mirza were the defending champions, but lost in the quarterfinals to Babos and Shvedova.

Seeds

Qualifying

Draw

Finals

Top half

Section 1

Section 2

Bottom half

Section 3

Section 4

References

External links
 Ladies' Doubles draw
2016 Wimbledon Championships – Women's draws and results at the International Tennis Federation

Women's Doubles
Wimbledon Championship by year – Women's doubles
2016 in women's tennis
Wimbledon